The 1922–23 Cornell Big Red men's ice hockey season was the 18th season of play for the program. The teams was coached by Nick Bawlf in his 3rd season.

Season
After two good seasons, Cornell's third year back on the ice faced an uphill climb from the beginning. The team lost three of its stalwart players (Finn, Thornton and Wight) and would face a difficult task in replacing their talents. When the team was forming in early January, the team was further hamstring by the ineligibility of several potential replacement players. Coach Bawlf had no difficulty in finding students willing to play but the lack in quality led to grim projections for the season from the outset. Three returning players, Brockway, MacDonald and Tone, were known quantities for the Big Red but the rest of the potential lineup wasn't able to distinguish itself.

Despite concerns, Cornell opened their season well, losing to Dartmouth in overtime. The teams remained tied after three 12-minute periods but Dartmouth pulled away in overtime, scoring twice in the first 5-minute extra session. After a 0–0 tie against Clarkson the following week, The Big Red were handed their second loss of the season by MAC. Even will the poor start, Cornell was able to show that their defense was at least up to par.

After taking a week off for the semester break, the club returned with a game against Columbia. The forward roster was adjusted with Brockway going back to wing, where he had played last year, and Burnett and Davidson inserted into the starting lineup. Despite the changes, Cornell was unable to score and lost 0–1. A week later they hit the road and faced powerhouse Harvard. Though they fell 0–6, the Crimson were expected to be leagues ahead of the Big Red. The final game of the year came at Pennsylvania and Cornell was still unable to get a win, ending with a 2–2 tie after three extra periods.

Roster

Standings

Schedule and Results

|-
!colspan=12 style=";" | Regular Season

References

Cornell Big Red men's ice hockey seasons
Cornell
Cornell
Cornell
Cornell